The Freiwilligen-Stamm-Division ("Regular Volunteer Division") was a German infantry division of the Wehrmacht during World War II. It was created on 1 February 1944 in Southern France. The Division was a so-called Ostlegion, which means its personnel was made up from volunteers from the Soviet Union. Specifically Freiwilligen-Stamm-Division consisted of Turkic, Azerbaijani, Georgian, Tartar, Cossack, Armenian and other Soviet volunteers, spread over five regiments. The primary purpose of the division were anti-partisan operations against the French Resistance.

In 1944, the French Maquis started numerous uprisings in France. To defeat the French forces, units of the Freiwilligen-Stamm-Division were used in various operations. This included German operations against the maquis du Mont Mouchet, maquis de l'Ain et du Haut-Jura and the maquis du Vercors.

Part of these anti-Maquis operations also included , in which units of the Freiwilligen-Stamm-Division participated. During the operation, the 5th Cossack Regiment of the division conducted the Dortan Massacre at the French town of Dortan on 13/14 July 1944. Twenty-four civilians were killed in what the German command described as "reprisal measures". Days later on 21 July more civilians were executed, bringing the death toll to about 35 people. The village was then burned down and left to ruins.

Commanding officers
Generalleutnant Ralph von Heygendorff, 1 February 1944 – 11 March 1944
Generalmajor     Wilhelm von Henning, 11 March 1944 – 12 September 1944
Generalmajor     Bodo von Wartenberg, 12 September 1944 – May 1945

References

Bibliography
 
 
 
 

Military units and formations established in 1944
Infantry divisions of Germany during World War II
Military units and formations disestablished in 1945
Foreign volunteer units of the Wehrmacht
German occupation of France during World War II